"Breakfast in Vegas" is a song written and performed by Belgian acid house musician, Praga Khan. It featured on the album, Twenty First Century Skin.

Track listing
Belgium CD release
 "Breakfast in Vegas (radio edit)" - 3:43	
 "Breakfast in Vegas (Balearic Sunscreen Mix)" - 3:51

Belgium 12" release
 "Breakfast in Vegas (Airscape Remix)" - 7:08	
 "Breakfast in Vegas (Balearic 12" Club Mix)" - 5:50	
 "Breakfast in Vegas (Scuzzy's 3AM Cut)" - 6:06	
 "Breakfast in Vegas (C.S.J. Hardtrance)" - 7:13	
 "Breakfast in Vegas (Insider Remix)" - 4:20

US release
 "Breakfast in Vegas (Viva Las Huevos Album Version)" - 6:05	
 "Breakfast in Vegas (Greasy Eggs and a Line to Go mix)" - 5:47	
 "Breakfast in Vegas (Hard Rock with C.S.J. Hardcore Party)" - 7:12	
 "Breakfast in Vegas (Scuzzy's No Room Service After 10:00 Mix)" - 6:28

French release
 "Breakfast in Vegas (radio edit)" - 3:43	
 "Breakfast in Vegas (Wolf Remix)" - 8:20

European release
 "Breakfast in Vegas (radio edit)" - 3:43	
 "Breakfast in Vegas (Ballearic Sunscreen Mix)" - 3:51

Australian CD release
 "Breakfast in Vegas (7" Edit)		
 "Breakfast in Vegas (Balearic Sunscreen Remix Edit)
 "Breakfast in Vegas (Greasy Eggs And A Line To Go)		
 "Breakfast in Vegas (Airscape Remix)
 "Breakfast in Vegas (Insider Remix)
 "Breakfast in Vegas (Album Mix)		
 "Breakfast in Vegas (Balearic Sunscreen Club Mix)

Charts

References

1999 singles
1999 songs
Praga Khan songs